Gabriela Angaut (born 14 December 1963) is an Argentine alpine skier. She competed in two events at the 1984 Winter Olympics.

References

1963 births
Living people
Argentine female alpine skiers
Olympic alpine skiers of Argentina
Alpine skiers at the 1984 Winter Olympics
People from Esquel